Chen Hongyi (born September 19, 2002) is a Chinese figure skater. She is the 2020 Cup of China champion, a three-time Chinese national medalist (2018–20), and has skated in the final segment at five ISU Championships.

Career

Early years 
Chen began learning to skate in 2008.

2017–2018 season 
Chen's ISU Junior Grand Prix (JGP) debut came in September 2017, in Zagreb, Croatia, where she placed sixteenth. The following month, she finished tenth at a JGP event in Gdańsk, Poland. In December, she stepped onto her first senior national podium, taking bronze at the 2018 Chinese Championships. She qualified to the free skate and finished eighteenth overall at the 2018 World Junior Championships in Sofia, Bulgaria.

2018–2019 season 
Making her senior international debut, Chen placed sixth at the 2018 CS Asian Open Figure Skating Trophy in early August. She placed fourteenth at the 2019 Four Continents Championships.  She placed nineteenth at the 2019 World Junior Championships in early March, and then made her senior World Championship debut, placing nineteenth there as well.

2019–2020 season 
Chen made her Grand Prix debut, placing ninth at the 2019 Cup of China and eighth at the 2019 Rostelecom Cup.  After taking the silver medal at the Chinese championships, she placed eleventh at the 2020 Four Continents Championships. She was assigned to compete at the 2020 World Championships, but these were cancelled as a result of the coronavirus pandemic.

2020–2021 season 
With the pandemic continuing to affect international travel, the ISU assigned the Grand Prix based largely on geography. Chen was assigned to the 2020 Cup of China, which she won over the other Chinese ladies present by almost 40 points. Competing at the 2021 World Championships in Stockholm, Chen placed twenty-first. Her result qualified a berth for China at its home Winter Olympics in Beijing.

Programs

Competitive highlights 
CS: Challenger Series; GP: Grand Prix; JGP: Junior Grand Prix

References

External links 
 
 Also see Hongyi CHEN at UCLA

2002 births
Living people
Chinese female single skaters
Figure skaters from Beijing